José Fernández Montaña (1842, El Franco, Asturias – 1935) was a Spanish priest, jurist, linguist, and historian.

Works
New Light and true judgment on Philip II Madrid: Printing & Kids Maroto 1882.
Main features of Cardinal Cisneros, archbishop of Toledo, plus another on the Inquisition with appendix vindictive Philip II and the Royal Barefoot De Madrid. Madrid: Imp Hellenic, 1921.
Philip II, the prudent, and politics. Typography of the Sacred Heart. No date (circa 1914).
Felipe II slandered and Vindicated on points of Finance. With Appendices Proof of bulls and statements Protestant and schismatic Tertullian Against Madrid: Gregorio del Amo Sons, 1929.
New edition of the works of Blessed John of Avila, Apostle of Andalusia. Printing of San Francisco de Sales, 1901.

See also
Alfonso XIII of Spain

1842 births
1935 deaths
People from El Franco
Spanish Roman Catholic priests